The following article presents a summary of the 2007-08 football season in Venezuela.

Torneo Apertura ("Opening" Tournament)

Torneo Clausura ("Closing" Tournament)

Results 
The home teams are read down the left hand side while the away teams are indicated along the top.

Last updated: May 25, 2008Source: Apertura 2007 Fixture Clausura 2008 FixtureFixtures in green represent games played during the Apertura 2007 tournament, fixtures in red represent those played during the Clausura 2008.

Aggregate Table 

Last updated: May 25, 2008Source: FVF1 Winner of 2007–08 Copa VenezuelaPos = Position; Pld = Matches played; W = Matches won; D = Matches drawn; L = Matches lost; GF = Goals for; GA = Goals against; GD = Goal difference; Pts = Points.

"Championship" playoff 
Caracas F.C. and Deportivo Táchira F.C. ended with one championship each at the end of the Apertura and Clausura. Tournament rules establish that a playoff game is required. Deportivo Táchira won on away goal.

Venezuela national team 

This section will cover Venezuela's games from the end of the Copa América 2007 until June 19, 2008.

KEY:
 F = Friendly match WCQ2010 = 2010 FIFA World Cup qualification''

External links 
 Venezuelan Football Federation 
 RSSSF

 
Seasons in Venezuelan football